Peguis First Nation (formerly St. Peter's Band,  meaning new reserve) is the largest First Nations community in Manitoba, Canada, with a population of approximately 10,300 people (3,521 on reserve and 6,504 off reserve). The members of Peguis are of Saulteaux (Ojibway) and Cree descent.

The main reserve, Peguis 1B, is located approximately 196 kilometres north of Winnipeg. The reserve is currently located about 170 km northwest of the original reserve (called St. Peter's). It was moved to its present location in 1907 after an illegal land transfer.

The First Nation is named after Peguis, the chief who led a band of Saulteaux people from present-day Sault Ste. Marie, Ontario, area to a Cree settlement at Netley Creek, Manitoba, and later to present-day East Selkirk, Manitoba.

History 

Chief Peguis and his Band settled in an area north of present-day Selkirk in the late 1700s. Their history is documented in journals of the Hudson's Bay Company, the Lord Selkirk settlers, and the Church Missionary Society. Peguis and other chiefs signed the Selkirk Treaty in 1817. The treaty allocated land along the Red and Assiniboine Rivers to Lord Selkirk and his settlers for an annual rent of tobacco.

On 3 August 1871, Peguis' son Mis-Koo-Kinew (or Henry Prince) signed Treaty 1 on behalf of the St. Peter's Band, the name of the Peguis First Nation at the time. Treaty 1 specified that Peguis would be given  of land for each family of five people.

In 2008, Peguis First Nation announced the finalization of a land claims settlement with the federal Government of Canada. The claim is for land which was surrendered near Selkirk in
1907.

Reserves
Peguis First Nation consists of ten reserves: 1075 Portage Ave - Winnipeg, Peguis 1B, Peguis 1C, Peguis 1D, Peguis 1E, Peguis 1F, Pegius 1G, Peguis 1H, Peguis 1I and St. Peters Fishing Station 1A.
The reserves of Peguis total 30657.2 hectares (75755.6 acres) in area.

The main reserve lies adjacent to the northern borders of the Rural Municipality of Fisher. 1A is at the closest Lake Winnipeg access point near Peguis, the others are located near Selkirk, East Selkirk, Libau and in Winnipeg.

Media
The Peguis First Nation operates a First Nations community radio station, CJFN-FM 102.7.

Floods

2009

On 24 March 2009, Peguis First Nation along with Roseau River First Nation, Sioux Falls, St. Andrews, St. Clements and Selkirk, Manitoba, experienced a hydrological flood. The total cost of flood in the region was  40,000,000. 3,000 people were evacuated in the region. It was listed on the Canadian Disaster database.

2010
Heavy rain and high winds in the Interlake Region of Manitoba from 1 to 5 July 2010, caused flooding and evacuation of Peguis First Nation’s 250 residents. Approximately 300 homes on-reserve were damaged and several roads washed out. Most residents were temporarily relocated to Winnipeg and a few near Fisher River Cree Nation.

2011

By February 2011, Peguis First Nation were meeting with Aboriginal Affairs and Northern Development officials about controlling mould in the 75 homes damaged by flooding. In March 2011, as community piled sandbags in flood preparations, the Peguis First Nation's emergency measures co-ordinator, said Peguis First Nation experienced two major floods since 2009.

Preparation
In 2013, AANDC invested more than $4 million to Peguis First Nation for long-term flood proofing as part of a 2010 commitment to protect 75 homes.

Notable people
Marcia Anderson DeCouteau, former president of the Indigenous Physicians Association of Canada
Amy Clemons, a founding member of the first Indian & Metis Friendship Centre in Canada, recipient of the Order of Canada
Trevor Greyeyes, writer, journalist, editor
Linden McCorrister, hockey player, Brandon Wheat Kings
Cheryl McKenzie, journalist for APTN
Renae Morriseau, actress, storyteller, director 
Nile Expedition boatmen; Adam Cochrane, Alex Cochrane, Richard Henderson, John Pratt, Thomas Pratt, William Prince, George Settee
 Shirley Olson, a co-founder of the Original Women's Network, an Executive Director of the Assembly of Manitoba Chiefs, lawyer, community activist, an organizer of Peace Village (Winnipeg, Manitoba)
 Tommy Prince, soldier
 William Prince, singer-songwriter
Bill Shead, former mayor of Selkirk Manitoba, first CEO of Aboriginal Centre of Winnipeg
Murray Sinclair, senator in the Canadian parliament, Chair of the Truth and Reconciliation Commission of Canada, former Manitoba provincial court judge 
Rosa Walker, founder of the Indigenous Leadership Development Institute
Joshua Whitehead, writer
Kona Williams, first Indigenous Canadian forensic pathologist

See also
 Muskoday First Nation

References

External links
 Peguis First Nation
 Peguis Radio homepage

Interlake Reserves Tribal Council
First Nations governments in Manitoba
Saulteaux
Cree governments